Antònia Adroher i Pascual, born in Girona in 1913 and died in 2007 in Banyuls-sur-Mer, was a teacher and political activist from Catalonia, Spain.

Biography 
Antònia studied teaching at the Normal School of Teachers of Girona while she was a member of the Spanish Federation of Education Workers (FETE) within the UGT.

She was one of the founders of the POUM and during the Spanish Civil War, she was the first woman to become Counselor for Culture and Propaganda at the Girona City Council.

On 21 October 1936 With this mandate, she set up, an education system using innovative and progressive educational practices based on "rationalist principles of work" and fraternity In practice, it organizes a public and free school for all providing education in Catalonia. and ensuring children's care and health, on the basis of hygienist principles, and equality for boys and girls through gender diversity.

In 1939, she was exiled in Toulouse then in Paris where she founded, with her husband Carmel Rosa Baserba, the Casal de Catalunya. she returned to Catalonia in 1977, two years after the end of Franco's dictatorship.

Awards 
Antonia won then prize Premi Mestres 68 for her achievements in renovation of the pedagogy in Catalonia.

Also in 2006, she received the Creu de Sant Jordi. In Girona, a Public library (inaugurated in January 2008) and a street are named after Antònia Adroher.

References

2007 deaths
People from Girona
Spanish educators
Spanish women educators
Spanish exiles
Spanish emigrants to France
Spanish Trotskyists
Spanish Marxists
Activists from Catalonia
People of the Spanish Civil War
Women in the Spanish Civil War
1913 births